The Central District of Izeh County is a district (bakhsh) in Izeh County, Khuzestan Province, Iran. In the 2006 census, its population (including portions later split off to form Susan District) was 169,765, in 31,786 families; excluding those portions, its population was 153,226, in 28,915 families.  The district has one city: Izeh.  The district has five rural districts (dehestan): Holayjan Rural District, Howmeh-ye Gharbi Rural District, Howmeh-ye Sharqi Rural District, Margha Rural District, and Pian Rural District.

References 

Izeh County
Districts of Khuzestan Province